The 1912 University of Utah football team was an American football team that represented the University of Utah as a member of the Rocky Mountain Conference (RMC) during the 1912 college football season. In its third season under head coach Fred Bennion, the team compiled an overall record of 5–1–1 with a mark of 4–1 against conference opponents, tied with Colorado Mines for the RMC championship, and outscored all opponents by a total of 153 to 16. The team played its home games at Cummings Field in Salt Lake City.

Schedule

References

University of Utah
Utah Utes football seasons
Rocky Mountain Athletic Conference football champion seasons
University of Utah football